Achillea impatiens is a species of flowering plant belonging to the family Asteraceae. It is native to Central Russia, Mongolia, Kazakhstan, Northwestern China, and Romania.

References

impatiens
Plants described in 1753
Flora of temperate Asia
Flora of Europe